Jordan Roth (born November 13, 1975) is an American theater producer. He is the president and majority owner of Jujamcyn Theaters in New York City. Roth oversees five Broadway theatres including the St. James, Al Hirschfeld, August Wilson, Eugene O'Neill, and the Walter Kerr.

Early life
Born in New York City, Roth spent his elementary years in Ridgewood, New Jersey with his parents – billionaire real estate developer Steven Roth and theater producer Daryl Roth – and older sister. He returned to New York in middle school to attend the Horace Mann School. Throughout high school he performed in plays and  frequently attended Broadway shows with his mother, to whom he credits his early exposure to theater.

Roth graduated with degrees in philosophy and theater from Princeton University. He later received an MBA from Columbia Business School.

After graduating, Roth returned to New York City. In 1999, he produced The Donkey Show, an interactive Midsummer Night’s Dream set to disco music. The production, a disco club event combining elements of both theater and nightlife, ran for six years off Broadway, toured internationally, and runs weekly at the Oberon Theater in Cambridge, Massachusetts. The show was described by The New York Times as "a lark, an exuberant and witty splicing of disparate sources.”

Career
In 2001, Roth staged a musical revival of the 1975 Broadway hit, The Rocky Horror Show, which ran until 2002. Through the course of the run, the cast included Dick Cavett, Joan Jett, Luke Perry, Ana Gasteyer, and a rotation of guest narrators. The show was nominated for four Tony Awards including Best Musical Revival in 2001, five Drama Desk Awards, two Outer Critics Circle Awards, and a Drama League Award.

In 2005, Roth joined Jujamcyn Theaters as a resident producer. He was promoted to vice president in 2006. In 2009, while still at Jujamcyn, he began an MBA program at Columbia University. In September 2009, at age 33, he purchased a 50% ownership stake in Jujamcyn Theaters and became the company's president when Rocco Landesman, Jujamcyn's previous president and owner, was appointed by President Obama to run the National Endowment for the Arts. In 2013, he acquired a majority stake in Jujamcyn, with Landesman retaining a small interest and becoming President Emeritus.

Since Roth assumed the title of President, Jujamcyn Theaters has been home to productions such as the Tony Award-winning The Book of Mormon, Clybourne Park, Kinky Boots, A Gentleman's Guide to Love and Murder, and Hadestown, as well as productions of A Little Night Music, Bullets Over Broadway, Something Rotten!, Present Laughter with Kevin Kline, Frozen, Mean Girls, and Moulin Rouge!.

Roth has appeared on television as the Broadway correspondent to MSNBC's Morning Joe  and has played himself in a recurring role on the NBC television series Smash. Roth is a haute couture collector. He journaled the Spring 2019 Paris fashion week for Vogue magazine. The New York Times said Roth has become a “red carpet magnet” due to his “penchant for avant-garde couture.”

Roth hosts an interview series "Broadway Talks" at the 92nd Street Y, facilitating one-on-one discussions with Broadway actors. He also produced and starred in the YouTube animated series, “The Birds and the BS,” a comedic series addressing American culture in the Trump era; and publishes the online newsletter, Warmly Jordan. Previously, Roth founded the social network website Culturalist, which aggregated “Top 10” lists from users.

Awards and honors
Roth is a four-time Tony Award winner. He produced the 11-time Tony-nominated production of Angels in America, which won Tony Awards for Best Revival of a Play, Best Actor (Andrew Garfield), and Best Featured Actor (Nathan Lane) in 2018.

On February 2, 2019, Roth received the HRC Legacy Award, awarded by the Human Rights Campaign, an organization that raises funds in the fight for LGBT equality.

Philanthropy 
In 2007, Roth created Givenik.com, a service that allowed theater-goers to buy discounted tickets and give 5% of their ticket price to the charity of their choice. Givenik.com supported over 500 charitable organizations. As of 2020, it has ceased operations.

Roth supports organizations working for the arts, the city and for LGBTQ equality. He serves on the Board of Trustees for Freedom To Marry and Broadway Cares/Equity Fights AIDS and the Board of Governors for the Broadway League. He also supports the LGBTQ+ Suicide Prevention Hotline and The Trevor Project, a hotline for young people in crisis.

On October 17, 2016, Roth and Harvey Weinstein collaborated to produce Broadway for Hillary, a one-night fundraiser hosted by Billy Crystal, featuring Julia Roberts, Lin-Manuel Miranda, Hugh Jackman, Sarah Jessica Parker, Emily Blunt, Angela Bassett, Neil Patrick Harris, and Helen Mirren.

Personal life
In June 2003, Roth met Richie Jackson, a talent manager and executive producer. They married in September 2012. He is co-parent of Jackson Foo Wong, Jackson's son with his former partner, B.D. Wong. Roth's son with Jackson, Levi Emmanuel Roth, was born through surrogacy in 2016.

See also
 LGBT culture in New York City
 List of LGBT people from New York City

References

1975 births
Living people
American theatre managers and producers
20th-century American Jews
Horace Mann School alumni
Princeton University alumni
Place of birth missing (living people)
American LGBT businesspeople
LGBT producers
Columbia Business School alumni
Roth family
American chief executives
21st-century American Jews